Donnybrook railway station is located on the North East line in Victoria, Australia. It serves the northern Melbourne suburb of Donnybrook, and it opened on 14 October 1872.

History

Donnybrook station opened on 14 October 1872, with a single platform on the west side. The railway line opened a few months earlier, as part of the North East line to School House Lane.

In 1882, a second platform was provided, but duplication of the track in both directions was not completed for a few more years. A goods shed was erected in 1888, while the current station building on Platform 2 dates to 1900. The last siding was abolished in 1989.

In 1962, the Melbourne-Albury standard gauge line behind Platform 1 opened, along with the 900 metre Donnybrook Loop. Since 2011, the loop has been extended into a 6.8 kilometres long passing lane, as part of the Australian Rail Track Corporation's Melbourne–Sydney upgrade program, but has since been cut back to 2 kilometres in length.

In early 1976, the goods platform was abolished.

From 1998, the station was the terminus for some V/Line services from Craigieburn station, because it had a crossover between the two tracks at the Down end of the station. That practice ceased after Seymour services were upgraded and the suburban electric services were extended to Craigieburn in 2007.

In 1961, flashing light signals replaced hand gates at the Donnybrook Road level crossing, located at the Up end of the station. In 1998, boom barriers were provided.

A closed signal box is located on Platform 2. All signals, the crossover points and the signal control levers inside the signal box were removed in March 2011.

In 2016, Platform 2 was extended at the Down end of the station, to accommodate 6-car VLocity trains, allowing northbound commuters to enter and exit via any door. Southbound commuters, however, had to use the first three carriages of the train to board or alight, due to the shorter Platform 1.

On 23 April 2020, upgrades to the station were completed as part of the Regional Rail Revival project. The upgrades included 150 new car parking spaces, better pedestrian and bus access to the station, upgraded CCTV and extending Platform 1 at the Down end.

Demolished station Beveridge was located between Donnybrook and Wallan stations.

Platforms and services

Donnybrook has two side platforms. It is serviced by V/Line Seymour line and selected Shepparton line services, with most Shepparton line services running express through the station.

Platform 1:
  services to Southern Cross
  one weekday peak hour and weekend services to Southern Cross

Platform 2:
  services to Seymour
  two weekday and two weekend services to Shepparton

Transport links

Dysons operates one route to and from Donnybrook station, under contract to Public Transport Victoria:

 : to Craigieburn station

Kastoria Bus Lines operates one route to and from Donnybrook station, under contract to Public Transport Victoria:

 : to Mandalay (Beveridge)

Gallery

References

External links
Victorian Railway Stations gallery
Melway map

Railway stations in Australia opened in 1872
Regional railway stations in Victoria (Australia)
Railway stations in the City of Whittlesea